Sophia Charlotte may refer to:

 Sophia Charlotte of Hanover (1668 – 1705), daughter of Ernst August, Elector of Hanover
 Charlotte of Mecklenburg-Strelitz (1744 – 1818), Queen of the United Kingdom as spouse of George III

See also
 Sophie Charlotte (disambiguation), a similar name